Wonny Song (born 1978) is a Canadian pianist.

Biography
Song was born in South Korea and grew up in Montreal. He began piano studies at the age of eight and received a full scholarship to Philadelphia's Curtis Institute of Music in 1994. He earned a bachelor's degree from Montreal University in 1998 and continued his studies with Anton Kuerti at the University of Toronto and at The Glenn Gould School with Marc Durand. He completed his doctoral studies at the University of Minnesota in 2004, studying with Lydia Artymiw. He has also studied with Leon Fleisher, Jorge Chaminé and Marie-Francoise Bucquet. He has performed as a soloist with the Cincinnati Symphony, the Peoria Symphony Orchestra, the Orchestre Symphonique de Montréal, the Toronto Symphony Orchestra, the National Arts Centre Orchestra and the EuroAsian Philharmonic Orchestra in Korea and Thailand.

Song was director and director of artists-in-residence project of Lambda School of Music and Fine Arts in Montreal from 2008 to 2020. Wonny Song has been appointed Artistic Director of Orford Music (formerly the Orford Arts Centre) in May 2015. Mr. Song officially assumed his position at the beginning of summer 2015, at which time he began to prepare the 2016 program.

Awards and recognitions
 1994 – Gold Medal at the World Piano Competition, Cincinnati.
 1995 – First Prize and Best Artistic Interpretation Prize at the Montreal Symphony Piano Competition.
 1997 – Ludmila Knezkova Piano Competition, Nova Scotia.
 2000 – First Elinor Bell Fellowship, University of Minnesota.
 2001 – First and Grand Prize winner of the Minnesota Orchestra's WAMSO Competition.
 2002 – Galaxy Rising Stars Award, Ottawa.
 2003 – Prix d'Europe, Canada.
 2010 – Young Canadian Musicians Award.
 Claire Tow Prize.
 Miriam Brody Aronson Prize.
 Fergus Orchestra Soloist Prize.
 Washington Performing Arts Society Prize.
 Saint Vincent College Concert Series Prize.

Discography

See also

 Pianists
 Canadian classical music
 Young Concert Artists
 Lambda School of Music and Fine Arts

References

External links
  Lambda School of Music and Fine Arts
 Fondation Père Lindsay
 Mooredale Concerts
 Review of Song's recital at Zankel Hall, from The New York Times

1978 births
Living people
Canadian classical pianists
Canadian musicians of Korean descent
Musicians from Seoul
South Korean emigrants to Canada
University of Minnesota alumni
21st-century classical pianists